Fatos is an Albanian masculine given name, which means "daring", "brave" or "valiant". The name may refer to:

Fatos Arapi (born 1930), Albanian poet
Fatos Beja (born 1948), Albanian politician
Fatos Bećiraj (born 1988), Albanian-Montenegrin footballer
Fatos Daja (born 1968), Albanian footballer
Fatos Hoxha (born 1961), Albanian politician
Fatos Kongoli (born 1944), Albanian writer
Fatos Lala (born 1995), Albanian footballer
Fatos Lubonja (born 1951), Albanian writer
Fatos Nano (born 1952), Albanian politician and prime minister
Fatos Pilkati (born 1951), Albanian sports shooter 
Fatos Tarifa (born 1954), Albanian diplomat

References

Albanian masculine given names